H. Robert Reynolds is an American musician, conductor and academic.  He is currently the principal conductor of the Wind Ensemble at the Thornton School of Music at the University of Southern California,  where he holds the H. Robert Reynolds Professorship in Wind Conducting.

Career
His appointment at the University of Southern California followed his retirement, after 26 years, from the School of Music of the University of Michigan where he served as the Henry F. Thurnau Professor of Music, director of university bands, and director of the division of instrumental studies. In addition to these responsibilities, he has also been for nearly 30 years, the conductor of the Detroit Chamber Winds and Strings, which is made up primarily of members from the Detroit Symphony.

H. Robert Reynolds has conducted in Carnegie Hall and Lincoln Center (New York), Orchestra Hall (Chicago), Kennedy Center (Washington, D.C.), Powell Symphony Hall (St. Louis), Academy of Music (Philadelphia), and Walt Disney Concert Hall (Los Angeles). In Europe, he conducted the premiere of an opera for La Scala Opera (Milan, Italy), and concerts at the prestigious Maggio Musicale (Florence, Italy), the Tonhalle (Zurich, Switzerland), and at the Holland Festival in the Concertgebouw (Amsterdam, the Netherlands), as well as the 750th Anniversary of the City of Berlin. He has won the praise of numerous composers, including Aaron Copland, Karel Husa, Gyorgy Ligeti, Darius Milhaud, Gunther Schuller, and many others for his interpretive conducting of their compositions.

Reynolds has been awarded an honorary doctorate from Duquesne University, and, in addition, holds degrees in music education and performance from the University of Michigan, where he was the conducting student of Elizabeth Green. He began his career in the public schools of Michigan and California (Anaheim HS) before beginning his university conducting at California State University at Long Beach and the University of Wisconsin, prior to his tenure at the University of Michigan.

Robert Reynolds currently spends his summers conducting the Young Artists Wind Ensemble at the Boston University Tanglewood Institute. This program works closely with the Boston Symphony Orchestra and the Tanglewood Music Center. The group includes young musicians from all across North America, and consistently performs the music at the highest difficulty to the highest quality. He shares this responsibility with David Martins, director of Wind Ensembles at Boston University.

Awards and recognition
Professor Reynolds is past president of the College Band Directors' National Association and the Big Ten Band Directors' Association. He has received the highest national awards from Phi Mu Alpha, Phi Beta Mu, the National Band Association, and the American School Band Directors' Association, and he was awarded the Medal of Honor by the International Mid-West Band and Orchestra Clinic. Kappa Kappa Psi, the national band fraternity, awarded him the Distinguished Service to Music Medal. He is the recipient of a Special Tribute from the State of Michigan, and he is member of the National Awards Panel for the American Society of Composers, Authors, and Publishers (ASCAP) and in 2001 received a national award from this organization for his contributions to contemporary American music. He received the Citation of Merit from the Music Alumni Association of the University of Michigan for his contributions to the many students he has influenced during his career and the Lifetime Achievement Award from the Michigan Band Alumni Association. He is also an Honorary Life Member of the Southern California School Band and Orchestra Association.

Many of his former students now hold major conducting positions at leading conservatories and universities, and several have been National Presidents of the College Band Directors National Association (CBDNA).

References

External links
 BandDirectors.com - The University of Michigan Bands: The Next Generation - An interview with Michael Haithcock and Steven D. Davis  
 GIA Publications, Inc. - Biography of H. Robert Reynolds 
 Living Music - Biography of and Interview with H. Robert Reynolds 
 Marching.com - Bands of America Hall of Fame Inductees, as of 2010 

Living people
American male conductors (music)
American male composers
21st-century American composers
University of Michigan School of Music, Theatre & Dance alumni
University of Michigan faculty
USC Thornton School of Music faculty
Distinguished Service to Music Medal recipients
1934 births
21st-century American conductors (music)
21st-century American male musicians